Pall is a surname, and it can also be a given name. Notable people with the name include:

Surname
 Alex Pall (born 1985), American musician, member of The Chainsmokers
 Ameet Pall (born 1987), Canadian football defensive end
 David Pall (1914–2004), American chemist, founder of Pall Corporation
 Donn Pall (born 1962), American baseball pitcher
 Gloria Pall (born 1929), American model, showgirl, film and television actress, author and businesswoman
 Lisi Pall (born 1951), Austrian alpine skier
 Olga Pall (born 1947), Austrian alpine skier
 Valdek Pall (1927–2013), Estonian linguist

Given name
 Pall Jenkins, American vocalist, guitarist and music producer

See also
 Paul (name)